Howard Hall may refer to:

 Howard Hall (actor) (1867–1921), American actor and writer
 Howard Hall (racing driver) (1885–?), American racecar driver
 Howard Tracy Hall (1919–2008), American physical chemist
 Howard L. Hall (1918–1996), member of the Cumberland County Board of Education, namesake of Howard Hall Elementary School
 Howard Hall (University of Notre Dame), a residence hall at the University of Notre Dame

See also

Hall, Howard